Jay Taylor may refer to:

F. Jay Taylor (1923–2011), American historian (List of presidents of Louisiana Tech University)
Jay Taylor (author) (born 1931), American foreign service agent, academic, documentarian
Jay Taylor (basketball) (1967–1998), American shooting guard
Jay Taylor (defensive back) (born 1967), American football cornerback
Jay Taylor (placekicker) (born 1976), American football kicker
Jay Taylor (actor) (born 1983), English writer and director